The 1995 European Wrestling Championships were held in the Greco-Romane in Besançon 26 – 30 April 1995; the men's Freestyle style in Fribourg 8 – 11 April 1995.

Medal table

Medal summary

Men's freestyle

Men's Greco-Roman

References

External links
Fila's official championship website

Europe
W
W
European Wrestling Championships
Euro
Euro
1995 in European sport